Michael Moore is a Scottish former professional footballer, who played in the Scottish Football League First Division for three clubs and is best known for his scoring record at Stranraer.

Career

Moore began his career with Hamilton Academical, and scored on his debut as a seventeen-year-old against Hibernian in a First Division match in November 1998. With Hamilton dogged by financial problems which eventually led to their relegation to the Third Division, Moore joined Stranraer in July 2002.

Moore was SPFA Third Division Player of the Year in 2003–04, a season in which he equalled Derek Frye's record as Stranraer's top scorer in a season with twenty seven goals. This prolific form earned him a £35,000 move back to full-time football with St Johnstone in 2004, but he returned to Stranraer the following year for the same fee. He later played for Ayr United and Dumbarton before heading back to Stranraer for a third and final time in June 2009, having spent the end of the previous season there on loan.

Moore indicated his wish to leave Stranraer at the end of the 2012–2013 season and ended his time with the club having scored ninety four times in two hundred and eighty-eight appearances.

He joined Junior club Kilbirnie Ladeside in July 2013, teaming up with former Stranraer teammates Mark Crilly and Stephen Swift. He became assistant manager to Swift at Lowland Football League side BSC Glasgow in 2017.

References

External links

1981 births
Footballers from Paisley, Renfrewshire
Scottish footballers
Association football forwards
St Johnstone F.C. players
Dumbarton F.C. players
Ayr United F.C. players
Stranraer F.C. players
Hamilton Academical F.C. players
Kilbirnie Ladeside F.C. players
Living people
Scottish Football League players
Scottish Junior Football Association players